Michaela Croal Leonard (born 6 April) is an Australian rugby League player. She made her debut for Australia against China women's national rugby union teamChina  in 2019.

Personal life 
Leonard graduated from the University of Canberra with a Bachelor of Physiotherapy.

Rugby Career 
Leonard plays club rugby for Tuggeranong Vikings and for the Brumbies in the Super W competition. She was named as co-captain of the Brumbies ahead of the 2020 Super W season, but the season was cut short due to the COVID-19 outbreak and the NSW Waratahs were crowned champions. She only started playing rugby union ahead of the Brumbies tryouts before the inaugural season of Super W in 2018; she was named Brumbies rookie of the year.

In 2021, Leonard was named as captain of the Brumbies for the 2021 Super W season.

2022 
Leonard and fellow Wallaroo, Arabella McKenzie, both signed with New Zealand club Matatū for the inaugural season of Super Rugby Aupiki in 2022. She was named in Australia's squad for the 2022 Pacific Four Series in New Zealand. She was selected in the Wallaroos squad for a two-test series against the Black Ferns at the Laurie O'Reilly Cup.

Leonard was selected in the team again for the delayed 2022 Rugby World Cup in New Zealand.

References

External links
Wallaroos Profile

1995 births
Living people
Australian female rugby union players
Australia women's international rugby union players